The 22923 / 22924 Bandra Terminus - Jamnagar Humsafar Express is a superfast train belonging to Western Railway zone that runs between Bandra Terminus and Jamnagar.

It is currently being operated with 22923/22924 train numbers on tri-weekly basis.

Coach composition 

The train was completely 3-tier AC sleeper trains designed by Indian Railways with features of LED screen display to show information about stations, train speed etc. and will have announcement system as well, Vending machines for tea, coffee and milk, Bio toilets in compartments as well as CCTV cameras.  Now the train consists of three-tier AC sleeper coaches and non-ac sleeper coaches.

Service

The 22923/Bandra Terminus - Jamnagar Humsafar Express has an average speed of 56 km/hr, and covers 813 km in 14 hrs 30 mins.

The 22924/Jamnagar - Bandra Terminus Humsafar Express has an average speed of 60 km/hr, and covers 813 km in 13 hrs 30 mins.

Route and halts 

The important halts of the train are :

Schedule

Rake sharing

The train share its rake with 19091/19092 Bandra Terminus–Gorakhpur Humsafar Express.

Traction

See also 

 Humsafar Express
 Bandra Terminus railway station
 Jamnagar railway station

Notes

References 

Humsafar Express trains
Rail transport in Maharashtra
Rail transport in Gujarat
Transport in Mumbai
Transport in Jamnagar
Railway services introduced in 2019